Vaska Easoff, also known as Letgohand Vaska (A Tale from the Labour Camp), is a 1996 Hungarian comedy film directed by Péter Gothár. The film was selected as the Hungarian entry for the Best Foreign Language Film at the 69th Academy Awards, but was not accepted as a nominee.

Cast
 Maksim Sergeyev as Vászka, a pityeri tolvaj
 Evgeniy Sidikhin as Ványka, a falusi tolvaj
 Valentina Kasyanova as Luvnya
 Boris Solominovits as Fetyka

Awards and nominations
 At the Hungarian Film Week of 1996, the film won the Grand Prize, Péter Gothár won the Best Director award, Francisco Gózon won the Best Cinematographer, Enikő Eszenyi won the Best Actress and Antal Cserna the Best Actor.
 At the 31st Karlovy Vary International Film Festival, the film was nominated for the Crystal Globe and Péter Gothár won the Best Director Award. 
 At the 1996 Chicago International Film Festival, the film won the Audience Choice Award.

See also
 List of submissions to the 69th Academy Awards for Best Foreign Language Film
 List of Hungarian submissions for the Academy Award for Best Foreign Language Film

References

External links
 

1996 films
1996 comedy films
Hungarian comedy films
1990s Hungarian-language films
Films directed by Péter Gothár